Nassarius dorsatus, common name the channeled nassa, is a species of sea snail, a marine gastropod mollusk in the family Nassariidae, the Nassa mud snails or dog whelks.

Description
The length of the shell varies between 15 mm and 45 mm.

The ovate, conical shell is smooth andof a uniform ashy white color. The spire is composed of eight whorls. The upper ones are slightly plaited, the lowest pretty large, marked with more or less straight, longitudinal lines, approximate, and of a color a little deeper and reddish. The base of the shell is ornamented with six or seven furrows. The ovate aperture is, white, fawn-colored within. The thick outer lip is arcuated towards the base, elevated exteriorly into a thick, very prominent margin.  Within it is striated throughout its whole length. The left lip is thick, and partially covering the columella, which is adorned with guttules one half of its length. The first of these guttules, which is uppermost, is much more marked than the others. At the base of the columella is found a very prominent fold, terminated by a guttule formed like a flattened point.

Distribution
This marine species occurs in the tropical Western Pacific, off East India, the Philippines, Papua New Guinea and Australia (New South Wales, the Northern Territory, Queensland, Western Australia)

Parasites 
 Stephanostomum-like cercariae from Australia: Cercaria capricornia VII and Cercaria capricornia VIII

References

 Röding, P.F. 1798. Museum Boltenianum sive Catalogus cimeliorum e tribus regnis naturae quae olim collegerat Joa. Hamburg : Trappii 199 pp. 
 Gray, J.E. 1826. Mollusca. pp. 474–496 in King, P.P. (ed.). Narrative of a Survey of the Intertropical and Western Coasts of Australia. Performed between the years 1818 and 1822; with Appendix B. London : John Murray Vol. 2 viii 637 pp., 9 pls.
 Kiener, L.C. 1834. Spécies général et Iconographie des coquilles vivantes, comprenant la collection du Muséum d'histoire Naturelle de Paris, la collection de Lamarck, celle du Prince Massena (appartenant maintenant a M. le Baron B. Delessert) et les découvertes récentes des voyageurs. Paris : Rousseau Vol. 9. 
 Reeve, L.A. 1853. Monograph of the genus Nassa. pls 1-25 in Reeve, L.A. (ed). Conchologia Iconica. London : L. Reeve Vol. 8.
 Cernohorsky W.O. (1981). Revision of the Australian and New Zealand Tertiary and Recent species of the family Nassariidae (Mollusca: Gastropoda). Records of the Auckland Institute and Museum 18:137-192.
 Cernohorsky, W.O. 1984. Systematics of the family Nassariidae (Mollusca: Gastropoda). Bulletin of the Auckland Institute and Museum. Auckland, New Zealand 14: 1-356
 Wilson, B. 1994. Australian Marine Shells. Prosobranch Gastropods. Kallaroo, WA : Odyssey Publishing Vol. 2 370 pp.

External links
 

Nassariidae
Molluscs of the Pacific Ocean
Gastropods described in 1798
Taxa named by Peter Friedrich Röding